Ozzie is a series of children's educational games developed by Tulsa, Oklahoma studio Digital Impact. They all star Ozzie S. Otter (voiced by Danny Harwell), a curious and imaginative young 7-year-old orphaned sea otter pup who serves as the series' main protagonist. The games focus on teaching children science and ecology in different environments. They also include several activities, stories, mini games and experiments to try out.

Design

Development
During the increase of children's educational software of the market, Digital Impact designed such a product around their year of establishment in 1993. The concept for the Ozzie series was based on Kathryn Sheehan and Mary Waidner's book "Earth Child". After acquiring the rights to the book, Digital Impact created Ozzie's World in eight months with just a handful of seven developers. Ozzie's World was also translated into 14 different languages, including European Spanish, French (Emme Interactive), Arabic (Sakhr's Ozzie's World), Brazilian Portuguese (MPO Video), and Chinese (Kingstar Media).

Digital Impact's choice of mascot was a kid sea otter named Ozzie S. Otter, being an endangered species to fit with the subject of ecology. Ozzie was designed to appeal to young users with his energetic, playful personality.

Digital Impact expanded the franchise with a spin-off series titled "Ozzie's Travels". They released three of those products that covered the cultures of Mexico, Japan and India. They intended introduce more titles for the cultures of Norway, Switzerland, Africa, Australia and a number of others, but those products never reached completion. The products each include five different games with cultural lessons and educational messages.

Art
Digital Impact began the Ozzie series with just one animator and two illustrators to create their first product. When the Ozzie's Travels began, they hired six additional artists, who used traditional cell animation with some inspirations from Disney. All animation frames were drawn on paper and then scanned to retain quality in the computer animation.

Educational goals
The game was leaned towards the education genre and not edutainment, teaching about the world people live in without computer orientation. The good use of audio and graphics keeps kindergarten group users amused and educated. Scientific experiments and facts are clearly explained. The interface is easy to navigate and gives users the opportunity to explore and interact. The games incorporate a mix of math, problem solving, memory games, ecology, reading development, general science and experiments to teach a variety of material.

Games

Main series
Ozzie's World (1994)
The Otter's Adventure (1995)
Ozzie's World - Deluxe Edition (1995)
Fun School Special: Young Scientist (1995)
Ozzie's Travels First Grand Tour (May 20, 1996)
Ozzie's Travels Destination Japan
Ozzie's Travels Destination Mexico
Ozzie's Travels Destination India
Ozzie's Science (August 20, 1996)

Demos
Ozzie's Funtime Garden (1995)
Ozzie's World - My House (1996)
Ozzie Explores the Forest (1996) Also known as "Ozzie's Forest"
Ozzie's Day at the Beach (1996)
Ozzie's Playroom (1996)
Ozzie Visits the Vet's Office (1996)

Availability
Byron Preiss's BABY-ROM - "Ozzie's Travels Destination Mexico".

Reception

Critical reception
MacAddict rated "Ozzie's Science" as Spiffy, praising the audio and humor, while criticizing the interface. MacUser scored "Ozzie's Travels Destination Mexico" 3 out of 5 stars, finding it entertaining and easy to learn from, but also a bit stereotype and the activities uneven. CD-ROM Today found the products had balanced teaching and fun. FamilyPC positively highlighted the surprises that the products had.

Commercial performance
Digital Impact sold the Ozzie products for lower prices than other state-of-the art multimedia markets, which resulted in successful sales, thanks to the lower prices of CD-ROMs. Digital Impact made an affiliation with Trees for Life and bundling copies of "Ozzie's World - Deluxe Edition" with seeds to increase environmental awareness.

Awards and nominations

|-
| 1994
| Ozzie's World
|  Family PC’s Top Product of the Year
|
|-
| 1997
| Ozzie's World Deluxe 
| Newsweek Editor's Choice Award
| 
|}

References

External links
Official website

Video game franchises
Children's educational video games
Environmental education video games
Video game franchises introduced in 1994
Video games developed in the United States
Video games set in Japan
Video games set in Mexico
Video games set in India
Windows games
Classic Mac OS games
Japan in non-Japanese culture